"A Drama in the Air" is an adventure short story by Jules Verne. The story was first published in August 1851 under the title "Science for families. A Voyage in a Balloon" ("La science en famille. Un voyage en ballon") in Musée des familles with five illustrations by Alexandre de Bar. In 1874, with six illustrations by Émile-Antoine Bayard, it was included in Doctor Ox, the only collection of Jules Verne's short stories published during Verne's lifetime. An English translation by Anne T. Wilbur, published in May 1852 in Sartain's Union Magazine of Literature, marked the first time a work by Jules Verne was translated into the English language.

Plot outline
Just as the narrator starts the ascent of his balloon, a stranger jumps into its car. The unexpected passenger's only intent is to take the balloon as high as it will go, even at the cost of his and pilot's life. The intruder takes advantage of the long journey to recount the history of incidents related to the epic of lighter-than-air travel.

This short story foreshadows Verne's first novel, Five Weeks in a Balloon.

English publication
The story has appeared in English translation in the following forms.

As "A Voyage in a Balloon" (translated by Anne T. Wilbur):
1852 – Sartain's Union Magazine of Literature

As "A Drama in Mid-Air" (translated by Abby L. Alger):
1874 – From the Clouds to the Mountains, Boston: Gill

As "A Drama in the Air" (translated by George M. Towle):
1874 – Dr. Ox and Other Stories, Boston: Osgood
1876 – A Winter Amid the Ice, and Other Stories, London: Sampson Low
1911 – Works of Jules Verne, Vol.1, New York: Vincent Parke,  ed. Charles F. Horne
1964 – Dr. Ox, and Other Stories, London: Arco/Westport, CT: Associated Booksellers: Fitzroy Edition, ed. I. O. Evans
1999 – The Eternal Adam, and other Stories, London: Phoenix, ed. Peter Costello

References

External links

 Illustrations  by Émile-Antoine Bayard
 Un drame dans les airs  available at Jules Verne Collection  

1851 short stories
Short stories by Jules Verne
Works originally published in Musée des familles

cs:Doktor Ox#Drama ve vzduchu